Novostroyka is a rural locality (a settlement) in Almozerskoye Rural Settlement, Vytegorsky District, Vologda Oblast, Russia. The population was 223 as of 2002. There are 9 streets.

Geography 
Novostroyka is located 46 km southeast of Vytegra (the district's administrative centre) by road. Volokov Most is the nearest rural locality.

References 

Rural localities in Vytegorsky District